Flavio Cipolla and Paolo Lorenzi won the first edition of the tournament, defeating Alejandro Falla and Eduardo Struvay in the final.

Seeds

Draw

Draw

External links
 Main Draw

Seguros Bolivar Open Barranquilla - Doubles
2011 Doubles